Judith Lynne Hanna  (born 1936) is an anthropologist, scholar, and author. She is an affiliate research professor in the Department of Anthropology at the University of Maryland, College Park. Her research focuses the relationship between dance and society in African villages and places of social interaction in America, such as schools and entertainment clubs. She has also conducted research on African cities, urban studies, and at-risk youth. She is the grandmother of YouTuber Merrick Hanna

Education and career
She earned a Ph.D. in anthropology from Columbia University in 1976, an M.A. in political science from Michigan State University and a B.A. in political science from UCLA.  Her field research with husband William John Hanna in Kenya, Nigeria, and Uganda in 1963, funded by a Michigan State University-Ford Foundation grant, resulted in the publication of her 1979 book To Dance is Human.

Hanna earned a California Teaching Credential and was a Los Angeles City School social studies and English teacher.

Hanna has researched various forms of dance, including in villages and cities in Africa, in American theaters and playgrounds, and in adult entertainment clubs and neo-burlesque venues in the United States.

She has served as an expert witness on over 150 court cases involving exotic dance since 1995, and her views on exotic dance have been sought by the Colbert Report and Bloomberg News. The Michelle Smith Library for the Performing Arts at the University of Maryland holds a collection of her work.

In 2018, Hanna participated in her first music video with the rock band, Egg Drop Soup.

Selected publications

 Dancing to Learn: The Brain's Cognition, Emotion, and Movement" (Rowman and Littlefield, 2015)
 Naked Truth: Strip Clubs, Democracy, and a Christian Right (University of Texas Press, 2012) 
 To Dance Is Human: A Theory of Nonverbal Communication (University of Chicago Press)
 Dance, Sex and Gender: Signs of Identity, Dominance and Desire  (University of Chicago Press)
 The Performer-Audience Connection: Emotion to Metaphor in Dance and Society (University of Texas Press)
 Dancing for Health: Conquering and Preventing Stress  (AltaMira Press)
 Disruptive School Behavior: Class, Race, and Culture (Holmes & Meier)

References

External links 
 

Columbia Graduate School of Arts and Sciences alumni
Michigan State University alumni
1936 births
Living people
Date of birth missing (living people)
Place of birth missing (living people)
University of Maryland, College Park faculty
American anthropologists
American women anthropologists
University of California, Los Angeles alumni
American women non-fiction writers
20th-century American non-fiction writers
21st-century American non-fiction writers
American Africanists
20th-century American women writers
21st-century American women writers